Peter Bernstein may refer to:

*Peter Bernstein (composer) (born 1951), American film and television composer
Peter Bernstein (guitarist) (born 1967), American jazz guitarist
Peter L. Bernstein (1919–2009), American author, economist and educator